Willie Frank Zapalac, Jr. (Bill) (born September 1, 1948) is a former American football linebacker and defensive end in the National Football League (NFL).

College football
Zapalac attended the University of Texas and played college football for the Longhorns. Zapalac was a 3-time academic all-conference and twice was named Academic All American in 1969 and 1970.  In 1970, he was elected as one of the four captains and was named to the National Football Foundation Academic All American team.  Zapalac started 33 straight games while playing 3 different positions on Texas teams that had a combined record of 30-2-1.   He graduated from the school of Architectural Engineering with Honors. In 2011, he was inducted in the University of Texas Hall of Honor.

Professional Athletic career
Zapalac was a 4th round selection (84th overall pick) in the 1971 NFL Draft by the New York Jets. He played for three years with the Jets (1971–1973).

Professional Career
Since retiring from football, Bill has worked in the construction industry since 1974.  For the past 27 years he has been president of Zapalac/Reed Construction in Austin, Texas.

References

External links
 New York Jets page

1948 births
Living people
American football defensive ends
American football linebackers
New York Jets players
Texas Longhorns football players
People from Bellville, Texas
Players of American football from Texas